Kalanchoe brasiliensis, the , saião, folha-da-costa or coerama, is a plant species in the genus Kalanchoe.

Patuletin acetylrhamnosides can be isolated from K. brasiliensis.

References

External links

brasiliensis